Reginald Moore Jones is a former professional American football player who played cornerback for four seasons for the New Orleans Saints and one year with the Cleveland Browns.

References 

1969 births
Living people
Players of American football from Memphis, Tennessee
American football cornerbacks
New Orleans Saints players
Cleveland Browns players
Arkansas Razorbacks football players
Memphis Tigers football players